The 1942 NCAA Track and Field Championships were contested as part of the 21st annual track meet to determine the team and individual national champions of men's collegiate track and field in the United States. This year's events were held at Memorial Stadium at the University of Nebraska in Lincoln, Nebraska.

USC captured the team national championship, their eleventh title.

Team Result
Note: Top 10 finishers only

See also
 NCAA Men's Outdoor Track and Field Championship
 1941 NCAA Men's Cross Country Championships

References

NCAA Men's Outdoor Track and Field Championship
1942 in sports in Nebraska
NCAA
June 1942 sports events